László Rác Szabó (born 12 May 1957 in Senta, Serbia, Yugoslavia) is an ethnic Hungarian politician in Serbia. He is the leader of Hungarian Civic Alliance.

References

Living people
People from Senta
1957 births
Hungarian Civic Alliance (Serbia) politicians
21st-century Serbian politicians